New York Locomotive Works may refer to:

 New York Locomotive Works (Breese Kneeland and Company) traded from 1853 to 1873
 Rome Locomotive Works traded from 1882 to 1911